the Darjeeling Himalayan Railway in West Bengal, India, had approximately one hundred pieces of rolling stock.  These include several of the narrow-gauge locomotives of India within the Northeast Frontier Railway zone.  , six out of thirteen remaining steam locomotives were operation.  Starting in 2017, it was planned to start producing new replacement parts and to stop the process of the cannibalism that had been used to keep the remaining steam engines going.



Locomotives

Passenger and freight
Beginning in 2008, the Indian Railways headquarters (Rail Bhavan) mandated that all narrow gauge railways in Indian, should move to a future standardised coach design.

Further reading

References

Darjeeling Himalayan Railway
Darjeeling Himalayan Railway
Darjeeling Himalayan Railway
Northeast Frontier Railway zone